The swelling capacity of a polymer is determined by the amount of liquid material that can be absorbed by it. This test can done by two methods:
 Beaker test method
 Tea bag test method

Beaker test method 
In this method
 A small amount of superabsorbent polymer material is taken (0.1g) and it is placed in the beaker.
 100 ml of deionized water is poured into the beaker.
 After 20 min the swollen polymer was separated by using [filter paper]
 By weighing the polymer, one can find the swollen capacity of the SAP material.

Tea bag test method 
 In this method, 0.1 g of SAP material is placed into a permeable bag, which is suspended over excess water in a beaker.
 Wait 20 min. and weigh the bag and then calculate the percentage of swelling through the following formula:
 (w2-w1)/(w1)  %
 w1= weight of the polymer (Before swelling)
 w2= weight of the polymer (After swelling)
 Note: Filter paper only for removing water.

References

Laboratory techniques